Matt Schnobrich (born November 12, 1978) is a competitive rower from Minnesota.  He received an Olympic bronze medal a member of the United States Men's Eight in the rowing events of the 2008 Summer Olympics in Beijing.

Schnobrich was raised in Saint Paul, and attended Saint Thomas Academy in Mendota Heights, where he competed in cross-country skiing. After graduation he went on to Saint John's University in Collegeville, Minnesota in 2001.  He had never rowed competitively before, but took up the sport on  the idyllic Lake Sagatagan in Stearns County on the campus of Saint John's.

Upon graduating from college he went on to earn a master's degree in engineering from the University of Minnesota. He continued to row on the Mississippi River, with the Minneapolis Rowing Club and University of Minnesota Men's Crew.

The 6'5" Schnobrich is a four-time national team member who won the pair at the 2008 U.S. Olympic Trials, won the pair at the third 2007 National Selection Regatta, won the pair at the 2006 USRowing Fall Speed Order, won the eight at the 2006 Head of the Charles, and won the pair at the 2005 National Team Trials.

References

See also
"Matt Schnobrich", Athlete Bios from USRowing. June 12, 2008.
Dan Timm, "Rowing takes Schnobrich to China".  New Ulm Journal, July 8, 2008.

Living people
1978 births
University of Minnesota College of Science and Engineering alumni
Rowers at the 2008 Summer Olympics
Olympic bronze medalists for the United States in rowing
American male rowers
College of Saint Benedict and Saint John's University alumni
Medalists at the 2008 Summer Olympics
2008 in sports in Minnesota